Ottilie Bistram (1859–1931) was a Baltic German writer and teacher. She was also a pioneer in the struggle for female access to education.

References
 BBLD - Baltisches biografisches Lexikon digital

1859 births
1931 deaths
Latvian educators
19th-century Latvian people
Baltic-German people